The 1924 United States presidential election in California took place on November 4, 1924 as part of the 1924 United States presidential election. State voters chose 13 electors, or representatives to the Electoral College, who voted for president and vice president.

Background
Since the "Panic of 1893" and large-scale voter registration, California had become a one-party state dominated by the Republican Party. The Democratic Party was largely moribund as a result of its association with the Populist revolt, the rural formerly slave South, and the polyglot metropolis – which held no appeal in an old-stock Western state with very few Southern and Eastern European immigrants. Rigid registration laws and, before 1914, poll taxes, largely disfranchised what immigrants (who had leaned Democratic during the Third Party System) did enter the state.

Nonetheless, the appeal of Progressivism and tendency towards nonpartisan politics allowed Woodrow Wilson to nearly carry the state in 1912 and do so in 1916 despite substantial Socialist votes in both elections; however, James M. Cox lost most of this support by 1920 as a result of a powerful reaction in the West against the social upheaval Wilson had caused.

Following the Cox debacle, the Democratic Party disintegrated even further: in 1922 they elected only four seats in the state House of Representatives, and had failed to elect an open Senator in 1920, and defeated James D. Phelan's efforts to have William Gibbs McAdoo nominated as Democratic presidential candidate in 1924 further ruined the party's organization and furthered cleavages between the "dry" and "wet" sections of the party.

California's large "Progressive" electorate had been divided by issues such as the League of Nations and Prohibition, and was weakened by the election of economy-minded Friend W. Richardson as Governor in 1922. When Wisconsin Senator Robert La Follette announced he would run a third-party presidential campaign in 1924, there remained division, but radical San Francisco Progressive Rudolph Spreckels supported him on the "Socialist" line against indifference from Hiram Johnson (who had attempted to unseat Coolidge in the GOP primaries) and State Senators Herbert Jones and Inman.

Vote
Democratic nominee John W. Davis of West Virginia and Coolidge both spent most of their campaign attacking La Follette as a political extremist.

At the beginning of the campaign, Davis had substantial hope of recovering support lost in 1920. However, Davis' opposition to women's suffrage, and belief in strictly limited government with no expansion in nonmilitary fields had almost no appeal in California. Although in September Davis underwent an extensive tour of the region and of the Great Plains, and campaigned to eliminate the income tax burden of the poorer classes, he received a mere 8.23 percent of the vote in California – the worst for any major party nominee in California's history and his fourth-worst state nationwide.

Reduced to a battle between Coolidge and La Follette, the incumbent President campaigned upon present prosperity in addition to his opponent's perceived extremism. Despite perception the state may be doubtful, Coolidge won a plurality of over 24 percentage points, aided by a campaign based upon vilification. La Follette did nonetheless match Coolidge outside conservative, heavily populated Southern California, and he carried most urban working class districts in Northern California, as well as most of the Sierra logging counties that were to become Democratic strongholds between FDR and Jimmy Carter. La Follette's vote was later to revive the moribund Democratic Party when it turned largely to Al Smith (whom his family was to endorse when he died) in the following election.

Results

Results by county

Notes

References

1924 California elections
California
1924